So Numb is the third studio album by the American instrumental metal band Sannhet. Produced by Peter Katis, it was released on August 25, 2017 through independent label Profound Lore Records.

Track listing

Personnel

Sannhet
AJ Annunziata – bass guitar and visuals
John Refano – guitar and loopers 
Christopher Todd – drums and samples

Additional musicians
Thom Wasluck – additional guitars on "Fernbeds"

Artwork
AJ Annunziata – photography
Stephanie Kimerly – photo assist
Jane Lea and Henry Stosuy – photo subjects

Production
Peter Katis – production, engineering, mixing
Greg Giorgio – recording
Jason Ward – mastering at Chicago Mastering Service

References

2017 albums
Sannhet albums
Profound Lore Records albums